Magic Kitchen is a 2004 Hong Kong romantic comedy film directed by Lee Chi-ngai and starring Andy Lau, Sammi Cheng and Jerry Yan. The film was adapted from the novel of the same title by Hong Kong novelist Lam Wing-sum.

Plot
Yau became the proprietor and head chef of a successful restaurant since her mother died six months ago. Yau cooks according to the large collection of recipes her mother, who had tremendous talent as a culinary artist but never found success in the restaurant scene due to sexism, created over the years, but has no confidence in herself as a chef. When she visits Japan with her assistant Ho at the invitation of an Iron Chef style cooking show, she has a chance run-in with an old boyfriend, Chuen. Over the next weeks back in Hong Kong, Yau struggles with resurgent feelings for Chuen even as she discovers that one of her best friends has started seeing him. In the meantime, her steadfast supporter and assistant for the last three years, Ho, pushes her to be more bold in her art and experiment. Love and food intersects with surprising twists as she finally decides to leave the past behind and compete in the cooking challenge. In the end, love is the secret ingredient.

Cast
Andy Lau as Chuen Yao (guest star)
Sammi Cheng as Mo-yung Yau
Jerry Yan as Ho
Maggie Q as May
Nicola Cheung as Kwai
Anthony Wong as Tony Ho (cameo)
Daniel Wu as Kevin (cameo)
Stephen Fung as Joseph (cameo)
Michael Wong as Mook (cameo)
Sheila Chan as Yau's mother (cameo)
William So as Wine guy in May's party (cameo)
Jacqueline Law as Kwai's crab dinner guest (cameo)
Lee Lik-chi as Kwai's crab dinner guest (cameo)
Vincent Kok as Kwai's crab dinner guest (cameo)
Clarence Hui as Kwai's crab dinner guest (cameo)
Michael Tong as Don (cameo)
Teddy Lin as May's boyfriend (cameo)
Law Kar-ying as Yau's father (cameo)
Asuka Higuchi as Presenter of the "King Chef Show" (cameo)

Release
Magic Kitchen was released in Hong Kong on 5 January 2004. In the Philippines, the film was released on 11 February 2004.

See also
Andy Lau filmography

References

External links

2004 films
2000s Cantonese-language films
2004 romantic comedy films
Cooking films
Films directed by Lee Chi-ngai
Films set in Hong Kong
Films shot in Hong Kong
Hong Kong romantic comedy films
Media Asia films
2000s Hong Kong films